is a Japanese three-volume shōjo manga series by Ai Yazawa. It was first published in Ribon, a manga magazine primarily read by teenage girls.

In 2004 it was adapted into a live-action movie. The film was released in the United States by Geneon Entertainment, but as yet the manga has no official English translation.

Plot
Mizuki Mochizuki is a high school student who one day meets a man named Adam. In the two weeks they are together, she falls in love with him. The day he is to leave, she decides to follow him. Bringing her passport and a bag, she crosses one of Shibuya's many streets, on a red light, to follow him. When her ex-boyfriend calls out her name, she turns around, in the middle of the street, to see him running after her. While standing there, she is hit by a car.

Some time later, a girl named Hotaru, who has lost her cat, mistakes a stray as her own. The cat wanders into an abandoned home, and she squeezes through the bars to follow. Realizing that the cat isn't hers, she decides to leave, but is drawn in by a beautiful melody. She goes to where the sound is coming from, and discovers a girl playing a piano. After telling her friends about the girl, they all leave to check out the scene. When they go there, they cannot see the girl. They know she is real when Hotaru hands her a notebook, and she takes it from Hotaru's hands. They have no idea who this girl is, but they are determined to find out who she is and why she is there. The rest of the story follows their discoveries of the ghost they call Eve.

Characters

A 17-year-old high school student. She was in a car accident and ended up in a coma. When she wakes up, she has no memories of what happened in her days as Eve, the four kids, Adam, or anything that had happened during the two weeks while she was away, other than the fact that she had broken up with her boyfriend.

The protagonist of the story, a girl who met Mizuki when they were both in comas from car accidents. When she found Mizuki's ghost (Eve), she became committed to helping Mizuki. At the beginning of the manga, Hotaru says that she has a crush on Miura. By the end, when she apologizes to Sae (her best friend who also had feelings for Miura), she admits that she has a new crush on Sugisaki.

The identity of Mizuki's ghost when she was in a coma. Eve had no recollections of who she was but remembered that Adam was her lover, and that she must find him. She eventually started to remember little memories of being Sayaka Kamijou which confuses the four children as they knew that Eve was actually Mizuki. It is Sayaka who in a way possessed Mizuki's body. Only Hotaru could see her.

The lead singer of the band Evil Eye. It is implied that he committed suicide at 20 years old, after his girlfriend died of an illness.

Hotaru's best friend. She is sensible and loyal to her friends, and tried her best to help Eve. As the story progresses, Sae finds that she is starting to like Miura but continues to deny it since she knows that Hotaru had always had a particular interest in him. However, near the very end of the manga, when Hotaru apologizes to Sae and asks her if she liked Miura, she denies it.

Hotaru's schoolmate and the son of the doctor who took care of Hotaru when she was in a coma. He became involved in the quest to help Eve as well. It seems that later on in the story, he develops an obvious crush on Hotaru although it seems that she is oblivious to it.

Tetsu's best friend. His parents are divorced celebrities. He lives with his father, who is always away at work. Although he sometimes makes tactless comments, he sincerely wants to help Eve. In the movie, he is portrayed as wearing glasses and follows Hotaru into the house the first time she goes in. When he first met Hotaru, he comments that he thinks she is cute. It is hinted that he may have a slight interest in Sae later on.

Mizuki's ex-boyfriend. She put up with his infidelity until he cheated on her with her best friend. After they broke up, he wanted to apologize to her, but she was involved in an accident before he could do so. While Mizuki is in a coma, it becomes apparent that he really cares for and loves her, and that he regrets doing such things that had hurt her, remembering their past together and how they had first started dating.

Adam's beloved girlfriend. She was studying in England when she met him. Unfortunately, she died of a disease at about 17 years old.

Further reading

External links
Japanese official site of the movie 

1998 manga
Ai Yazawa
Geneon USA
Manga adapted into films
Mystery anime and manga
Supernatural anime and manga
Shōjo manga
Shueisha manga